The Xbox One gaming console has received updates from Microsoft since its launch in 2013 that enable it to play select games from its two predecessor consoles, Xbox and Xbox 360. On June 15, 2015, backward compatibility with supported Xbox 360 games became available to eligible Xbox Preview program users with a beta update to the Xbox One system software. The dashboard update containing backward compatibility was released publicly on November 12, 2015. On October 24, 2017, another such update added games from the original Xbox library. The Xbox Series X/S was released in 2020 and was confirmed to be backwards compatible with the same list of games as the Xbox One at launch. On November 15, 2021, a "final addition" of 76 titles was published as part of the 20th anniversary of the launch of the original Xbox console. This is the following list of all backward compatible games on Xbox One and Xbox Series X/S under this functionality.

History
At its launch in November 2013, the Xbox One did not have native backward compatibility with original Xbox or Xbox 360 games. Xbox Live director of programming Larry "Major Nelson" Hryb suggested users could use the HDMI-in port on the console to pass an Xbox 360 or any other device with HDMI output through Xbox One. Senior project management and planning director Albert Penello explained that Microsoft was considering a cloud gaming platform to enable backward compatibility, but he felt it would be "problematic" due to varying internet connection qualities.

Xbox 360
During Microsoft's E3 2015 press conference on June 15, 2015, Microsoft announced plans to introduce Xbox 360 backward compatibility on the Xbox One at no additional cost. Supported Xbox 360 games will run within an emulator and have access to certain Xbox One features, such as recording and broadcasting gameplay. Games do not run directly from discs. A repackaged form of the game is downloaded automatically when a supported game is inserted, while digitally-purchased games will automatically appear for download in the user's library once available. As with Xbox One titles, if the game is installed using physical media, the disc is still required for validation purposes.

Not all Xbox 360 games are supported; 104 Xbox 360 games were available for the feature's public launch on November 12, 2015, with Xbox One preview program members getting early access. Launch games included the Gears of War series, Mass Effect, Borderlands, Mirror's Edge, Assassin's Creed II, and more. Microsoft stated that publishers will only need to provide permission to the company to allow the repackaging, and they expect the list to grow significantly over time. Unlike the emulation of original Xbox games on the Xbox 360, the Xbox One does not require game modification, since it emulates an exact replica of its predecessor's environment – both hardware and software operating systems. The downloaded game is a repackaged version of the original that identifies itself as an Xbox One title to the console. At Gamescom, Microsoft revealed it has plans to ensure "all future Xbox 360 Games with Gold titles will be playable on Xbox One." On December 17, 2015, Microsoft made another sixteen Xbox 360 games compatible with Xbox One, including titles such as Halo: Reach, Fable III and Deus Ex: Human Revolution. On January 21, 2016, Microsoft made another ten Xbox 360 games compatible, including The Witcher 2: Assassins of Kings and Counter-Strike: Global Offensive. On May 13, 2016, Microsoft made Xbox 360 titles with multiple discs compatible, starting with Deus Ex: Human Revolution Director's Cut. In January 2016, Microsoft announced that future titles would be added as they became available, instead of waiting until a specific day each month.

Original Xbox
During Microsoft's E3 2017 press conference on June 11, 2017, Microsoft announced that roughly 50% of Xbox One users had played an Xbox 360 game on Xbox One through the system's backward-compatibility feature. Based on popular demand, Phil Spencer, Microsoft's Head of Xbox, announced that Xbox One consoles would be able to play select games made for the original Xbox console, first released in 2001. The compatibility works on all consoles in the Xbox One family, including the Xbox One X, and was made available as a free update in the fall of 2017.

The functionality is similar to that for back-compatibility with Xbox 360 games. Users insert the Xbox game disc into their Xbox One console to install the compatible version of the game. While players are not able to access any old game saves or connect to Xbox Live on these titles, system link functions will remain available. Xbox games do not receive achievement support, although when asked about this component, Spencer responded that they had nothing to announce at the current time.

Realizing that game discs for original Xbox consoles could be scarce, Spencer said that plans were in place to make compatible Xbox games available digitally. Spencer also said that such games may also be incorporated into the Xbox Game Pass subscription service. In a later interview, Spencer indicated that the potential library of Xbox titles being playable on Xbox One will be smaller than that currently available from the Xbox 360 library. Spencer noted two reasons for the more limited library were the availability of content rights for the games and the technical difficulties related to the conversion.

Xbox Series X/S
At its press briefing for E3 2019 on June 9, 2019, Microsoft announced its future gaming console, Xbox Series X, scheduled for release for the 2020 holiday season. One of the Series X's features includes full backward compatibility with all Xbox One titles and the list of original Xbox and Xbox 360 titles currently available. As Microsoft's future events were directed towards the new platform, additional efforts to bring original Xbox and Xbox 360 titles to Xbox One were stopped. This was meant to set a fixed target for testing of backward compatibility titles for the Xbox Series X as to make sure their full library was ready in time for launch.

By May 2020, as the Xbox Series X was nearing release, Microsoft announced they were seeking further requests from players of what games to expand their backward compatibility library with. The company stated, "Resurrecting titles from history often presents a complex mix of technical and licensing challenges, but the team is committed to doing everything we can to continue to preserve our collective gaming legacy."

In September 2020, Microsoft announced that the Xbox Series S will run Xbox One S versions of backward compatible games while applying improved texture, faster loading speeds, higher frame rates and auto HDR.

In September 2021, seven original Xbox titles, including Dead or Alive 3 and Dead or Alive Ultimate, were briefly added to the Microsoft Store before being delisted, implying the return of the program. In October, two Xbox 360 titles were added. Then, in November, 11 original Xbox titles were added to the Xbox 360 Marketplace.

On November 15, 2021, Microsoft released a "latest and final addition" of 76 titles to the list of backwards compatible games, stating they "have reached the limit of our ability to bring new games to the catalog from the past due to licensing, legal and technical constraints".

Standard backwards compatibility improvements
The following improvements are made to all backwards compatibility titles:
 Improved frame rate stability – The increased performance of the Xbox One allows titles to hit and maintain their max frame rate more consistently.
 Games utilizing a dynamic resolution will hit their max resolution more often, or at all times due to the increased performance of the Xbox One.
 16x anisotropic filtering – Greatly enhances the quality of textures.
 Forced V-sync – Prevents screen tearing.
 Variable refresh rate compatibility – Allows displays to match the current frame rate of the console, preventing stuttering and tearing and improving the smoothness of motion. A compatible display is required for variable refresh rates.

Xbox One X and Xbox Series X and S enhancements
Backwards compatible original Xbox and Xbox 360 titles will benefit from becoming Xbox One X enhanced with patches targeted at maximizing the use of the Xbox One X's hardware beyond the standard improvements that come with backwards compatibility. This may also include the following enhancements:
 Increased resolution – The title is capable of outputting up to 2160p. Enhanced games are rendered at 9x their original resolution. This means games that originally ran at 720p will run at 2160p (4K) on capable displays.
 HDR – The title supports HDR10 when used with a supporting display.
 Dolby Atmos – The title supports Dolby Atmos surround sound when used with a supporting sound system.

Along with these enhancements, certain titles on the Xbox Series X/S benefit from exclusive features:
 Auto HDR — Many titles do not support native HDR, but rather Auto HDR, an automatic form of HDR.
 FPS Boost — Some titles support increased frame rates of up to 60 frames per second and 120 frames per second.

List of compatible titles from Xbox 360
There are  games that have been made backward compatible out of  that have been released for Xbox 360.

List of compatible titles from Xbox
There are currently  on this list out of  released for the Xbox. All original Xbox games run at four times the original resolution on Xbox One and Xbox One S consoles (up to 960p), nine times on Xbox Series S (up to 1440p), and sixteen times on Xbox One X and Xbox Series X (up to 1920p). Certain games also benefit from Auto HDR and FPS Boost on Series X/S.

See also
 Xbox One system software
 List of Xbox games compatible with Xbox 360

References

External links
 Xbox One backward compatibility (Xbox.com)
 Xbox One backward compatibility game list (MajorNelson.com)

Backward compatibility
Xbox